Bachelor of Laws (LL.B.) is an undergraduate law degree in the United Kingdom and most common law jurisdictions.  Bachelor of Laws is also the name of the law degree awarded by universities in Australia, People's Republic of China, Hong Kong S.A.R., Macau S.A.R., Malaysia, Bangladesh, India, Japan, Pakistan, Uganda, Kenya, Ghana, New Zealand, Nigeria, Singapore, South Africa, Botswana, Israel, Brazil, Tanzania, Zambia, and many other jurisdictions. 

In the United States, the Bachelor of Laws was also the primary law degree historically, but was phased out in favour of the Juris Doctor degree in the 1960s. Canadian practice followed suit in the first decade of the 21st century, phasing out the Bachelor of Laws for the Juris Doctor.

History of academic degrees
The first academic degrees were all law degrees in medieval universities, and the first law degrees were doctorates. The foundations of the first universities were the glossators of the 11th century, which were also schools of law. The first university, that of Bologna, was founded as a school of law by four famous legal scholars in the 12th century who were students of the glossator school in that city. The University of Bologna served as the model for other law schools of the medieval age. While it was common for students of law to visit and study at schools in other countries, such was not the case with England because of the English rejection of Roman law (except for certain jurisdictions such as the Admiralty Court) and, although the University of Oxford and the University of Cambridge did teach canon law until the English Reformation, its importance was always superior to civil law in those institutions.

Origin of the LL.B.
The "LL." of the abbreviation for the degree is from the genitive plural  ("of laws"). Creating an abbreviation for a plural, especially from Latin, is often done by doubling the first letter (e.g., "pp." for "pages"). It is sometimes erroneously called "Bachelor of Legal Letters" to account for the double "L".

The bachelor's degree originated at the University of Paris, whose system was implemented at Oxford and Cambridge. The "arts" designation of the degree traditionally signifies that the student has undertaken a certain amount of study of the classics. In continental Europe the bachelor's degree was phased out in the 18th or early 19th century but it continued at Oxford and Cambridge.

The teaching of law at Oxford University was for philosophical or scholarly purposes and not meant to prepare one to practise law. Professional training for practising common law in England was undertaken at the Inns of Court, but over time the training functions of the Inns lessened considerably and apprenticeships with individual practitioners arose as the prominent medium of preparation. However, because of the lack of standardization of study and of objective standards for appraisal of these apprenticeships, the role of universities became subsequently of importance for the education of lawyers in the English speaking world.

In England in 1292 when Edward I first requested that lawyers be trained, students merely sat in the courts and observed, but over time the students would hire professionals to lecture them in their residences, which led to the institution of the Inns of Court system. The original method of education at the Inns of Court was a mix of moot court-like practice and lecture, as well as court proceedings observation. By the seventeenth century, the Inns obtained a status as a kind of university akin to the University of Oxford and the University of Cambridge, though very specialized in purpose. With the frequent absence of parties to suits during the Crusades, the importance of the lawyer role grew tremendously, and the demand for lawyers grew.

Traditionally Oxford and Cambridge did not see common law as worthy of study, and included coursework in law only in the context of canon and civil law and for the purpose of the study of philosophy or history only. The apprenticeship programme for solicitors thus emerged, structured and governed by the same rules as the apprenticeship programmes for the trades. The training of solicitors by apprenticeship was formally established by an act of parliament in 1729. William Blackstone became the first lecturer in English common law at the University of Oxford in 1753, but the university did not establish the programme for the purpose of professional study, and the lectures were very philosophical and theoretical in nature. Blackstone insisted that the study of law should be university based, where concentration on foundational principles can be had, instead of concentration on detail and procedure had through apprenticeship and the Inns of Court.

The Inns of Court continued but became less effective, and admission to the bar still did not require any significant educational activity or examination. Therefore in 1846 the Parliament examined the education and training of prospective barristers and found the system to be inferior to the legal education provided in the United States. Therefore, formal schools of law were called for, but not finally established until later in the century, and even then the bar did not consider a university degree in admission decisions. When law degrees were required by the English bar and bar associations in other common law countries, the LL.B. became the uniform degree for lawyers in common law countries.

Structure of LL.B. programmes
Historically, law students studied both canon law and civil law. Today, this is much less common among common law countries, who now study the English-derived common law system, which includes the criminal law of some jurisdictions. Countries where the legal system was "mixed" (that is, where a mixture of the common law and the civil law form the foundations of the legal system), such as Scotland, Louisiana, South Africa and Quebec, continue the study of civil law. However, a few institutions in common law countries continue to offer alternatives to strictly English common law: for example Cardiff University's Department of Canon (Ecclesiastical) Law, or combined programmes in common and French civil law (pertinent to Canada's pluralist legal system) at McGill University and University of Ottawa.

Common law jurisdictions in general
In most common law countries (with the exceptions of all Canadian provinces except Quebec, and the U.S.), the Bachelor of Laws programme is generally entered directly after completion of secondary school.

England
The LL.B. is an undergraduate course. In England and Wales it is also possible to study a programme for conversion to the legal profession following completion of a previous undergraduate degree unrelated to law (the Graduate Diploma in Law), which entitles graduates to take the vocational courses for entry into the legal profession. Master's degree courses are also offered to university graduates; those who graduate from such courses are entitled to use the initials LL.M. (Master of Laws).

Scotland
Although Scotland has a mixed legal system, with both civil and common law influences, the undergraduate LL.B is the primary route into the legal profession, as in many common law jurisdictions. The Scots Law LL.B. is generally taken as a four-year honours course, in common with other university degrees in Scotland. Students wishing to satisfy the Law Society of Scotland requirements to become a solicitor must also complete the postgraduate Diploma in Professional Legal Practice at an approved university.

Australia
A qualifying law degree for the purposes of admission as a lawyer in Australia is either the undergraduate LL.B. (Bachelor of Laws) programmes at accredited universities recognised by the admission board of the respective state, or the graduate J.D. (Juris Doctor). Every recognised qualification of each admission board is reciprocally recognised. However, prior to degrees, there existed an alternative to a degree to become a lawyer in Australia, which was either the Barrister's Admission Board, or the Solicitor's Admission Board, whose examinations rendered one eligible to be admitted respectively, the successor of these boards that still operates this alternative is the Legal Profession Admission Board which issues the distinct Diploma in Law which is equivalent to either an LL.B. or a J.D. Law degrees typically last 4 years for undergraduate admission or 3 years for university graduates.

Additionally, of the thirty-eight law schools, thirteen of those universities have also started offering the Juris Doctor (J.D.) as a graduate-entry degree.

Bangladesh
In Bangladesh, as in other common-law countries, obtaining a Bachelor of Laws (LL.B.) degree is a prerequisite for practising as an advocate in a court of law. Both LL.B. and LL.B. (Hons.) degrees are offered at public and private universities. Only seven public universities offer LL.B. (Hons.) degree. These universities also offer one-year LL.M. courses. Some private universities also offer four-year LL.B. (Hons.) degrees and one-year LL.M. courses. The National University of Bangladesh also offers a two-year LL.B. degree to graduates of subjects other than law.
But remarkably, the department of Law, University of Rajshahi is the first institute in South Asia to offer bachelor's degree in law with honors as B. Jur.(Bachelor of Jurisprudence) and M. Jur. (Masters of Jurisprudence) from 1970 (not offered in the years 1971 & 1972).  Later on they were replaced with LL. B (Hons.) and LL.  M degree respectively. This institute is considered the leading institute to study legal science in Bangladesh having a great number of alumni and former members of the faculty around the world including former president, chief justice, ministers of several governments and many of the former and current judges of the apex courts and the courts of the lower judiciary of Bangladesh and many more formidable legal minds of the country. As per the number of participants in the admission tests, this is considered one of the most desirable choices for the High school/college students of Bangladesh.

Canada

Canada has two legal systems. The Province of Quebec uses a civil law system. At the federal level, as well as in every province or territory except Quebec, a system of common law is used. Because of this, there are two types of Canadian law degrees generally in use.

Common law 
The programme of study for common law has traditionally been an undergraduate LL.B. degree, which has now been re-designated as a J.D. at nearly all Canadian common law schools. Entrants to the J.D. programme generally hold an undergraduate degree before registration in the law programme and a significant number hold a graduate-level degree as well. However, admission may be granted to applicants with two years of undergraduate studies towards a degree. Unlike the United States, the J.D. is considered a bachelor's degree-level qualification, albeit a "second-entry" one. The common law programme is three years in length. Upon graduation, one holds a Bachelor of Laws or Juris Doctor degree, but cannot yet practise law. To practise law, the graduate must obtain a licence from the Law Society of the province where they wish to practise law, which also requires a year of articling. Those law graduates wishing to become law professors instead of lawyers often obtain a more advanced academic degree, such as the Master of Laws (LL.M.) or the Doctor of Laws (LL.D., S.J.D. or D.C.L.).

Civil law 
The civil law programme in Canada is three years in length. The programme of study for the first degree in Quebec civil law (called LL.B., B.C.L. or LL.L.) is a first-entry degree programme. Like other first-entry university programmes in Quebec, it requires a college diploma for entry. Law schools that offer civil law B.C.L., LL.B., or LL.L. degrees include McGill University, Université de Montréal, Université du Québec à Montréal, Université de Sherbrooke, Université Laval and the University of Ottawa.

Bijuridical 
Because of Canada's dual system of laws, some law schools offer joint or dual degrees in common law and civil law: McGill University, Université de Montréal, Université de Sherbrooke and the University of Ottawa. The law degree offered by McGill University is a mandatory joint common law LL.B. / Quebec civil law B.C.L. degree. The programme is four years in length. Admission to that programme is a first-entry programme in the case of Quebec students (as a college diploma is required) while it is a second-entry programme in the case of students from other provinces (since two years of university studies is required—effectively one extra year of studies more than for a college diploma). The University of Ottawa offers a civil law degree (LL.L.) on its own.

A number of Canadian law schools offer students the opportunity to earn, besides their three-year first degrees in common law, programmes in common law for holders of baccalaureate degrees in Quebec civil law enabling those individuals to earn the LL.B. in common law in two or three semesters, depending on the offering university's programme. Similarly, the University of Ottawa offers, besides its three-year LL.L. programme in Quebec civil law, a one-year LL.L. programme in Quebec civil law for holders of an LL.B. or J.D. degree in common law from a Canadian law school.

Additionally, some Canadian universities with common law law schools have an arrangement with a Canadian university with a Quebec civil law law school enabling students to obtain the home school's law degree in three years and the exchange school's law degree in the fourth year.

Hong Kong
In Hong Kong, three universities, including The University of Hong Kong, Chinese University of Hong Kong, and City University of Hong Kong, provide legal studies with both LL.B. degree or J.D. degree, where the former is for students right after secondary school, and the latter is for the degree holders. LL.B. is 4 years in length, while J.D. is 2 years. Students who had an LL.B. or J.D degree, whether conferred by local universities or the accredited universities overseas, would be eligible to apply for admission to PCLL, the legal qualification programme in Hong Kong.

On top of LL.B., University of Hong Kong offers a variety of Mixed-Degree programmes that allow students to take a first degree and then have an option to take a conjunctive law degree, including Bachelor of Business Administration (Law) (abbreviated as "BBA(Law)&LLB", or as BLaw), Bachelor of Social Science (Government & Laws) ("BSocSc(Govt&Laws)&LLB", or as GLaws), and Bachelor of Arts (Literary Studies) ("BA&LLB", or as ALaw). Previous mixed-Degree programme also includes Bachelor of Engineering (Civil Engineering).

India

In India, legal education is traditionally offered as a three-year graduate degree conferring the title of Bachelor of Laws (LL.B./B.L.), requiring prospective students to have a bachelor's degree in any subject from a recognised institution.

However, specialised universities of law known as National Law Universities solely devoted to legal education offer an undergraduate five-year law course for students that have completed Class XII from a recognised board of education in India. The five-year law course leads to an integrated honours degree combining the LL.B. degree with another bachelor's degree, such as a Bachelor of Arts, Bachelor of Science, Bachelor of Business Administration, Bachelor of Commerce and Bachelor of Social Work. In these programs, students are taught subjects associated with the additional non-law bachelor's degree during the first two years, in addition to standard legal subjects such as torts, contracts and constitutional law, such as social sciences for the Bachelor of Arts and a combination of physical, life and applied sciences for the Bachelor of Science. In the latter three years of all these programmes, legal subjects dominate the curriculum.

The first national law school was the National Law School of India University. This was followed by others, including the Nalsar University of Law and West Bengal National University of Juridical Sciences. Today, many Indian universities offer five-year integrated BA LL.B. programmes similar to that of the national law schools of India, while others continue to offer a traditional three-year programme. Both integrated and traditional types of three-year law degrees are recognised by the Bar Council of India for to qualify for enrollment to the Bar. Though, one needs to have a full-time law degree to practice as a lawyer in India. Bar Council of India considers only full-time law degree programmes. Hence, distance or online education options are not available to become a practicing lawyer in India.

Malaysia

Malaysia inherited a common law system from the British colonial period. However, unlike the United Kingdom and some other Commonwealth countries, Malaysia adopted the fused legal profession with legal practitioners acting both as solicitors and in a way "barristers". Hence all are lawyers eligible and can be admitted to the High Court as a legal professional is entitled to be bestowed with the title "Advocate & Solicitor". This applies to both lawyers practising in the Peninsular Malaysia (Malaya) and the States of Sabah & Sarawak.

Under the Legal Profession Act 1976, a person is deemed to be a qualified person to be admitted as an Advocate & Solicitor if they completed and passed the course of Bar Vocational Course in UK & Wales from any Inns of Court, passed the Certificate in Legal Practice or completed a 4-year LL.B. (Honours) course from any of the following Universities:-

University of Malaya
National University of Malaysia
Universiti Teknologi MARA
International Islamic University of Malaysia
Universiti Utara Malaysia
Universiti Sultan Zainal Abidin
Malaysia Multimedia University

New Zealand
An LL.B. is required to practise law in New Zealand. An LL.B. typically takes four years to complete, although it is often completed concurrently with another degree, such as a Bachelor of Commerce (B.Com.) or Bachelor of Arts (B.A.), with the combined completion time usually being five years. Most New Zealand universities allow graduates of other degrees to complete an LL.B. in three years. Six New Zealand universities offer the LL.B. degree:
 University of Auckland
 Auckland University of Technology
 University of Waikato
 Victoria University of Wellington
 University of Canterbury
 University of Otago

Pakistan
Pakistan is a common law country and to become a lawyer in Pakistan, one needs a law degree usually called LL.B. from a Pakistani or a foreign university from common law country recognized by the Pakistan Bar Council. Lawyers in Pakistan are called advocates. An advocate has to be member of one of the provincial Bar Councils, i.e., Punjab Bar Council, Sindh Bar Council, Khyber Pakhtunkhwa Bar Council, Balochistan Bar Council or the Islamabad Bar Council.

The Bachelor of Laws obtained from universities in Pakistan consists of a 5-year B.A.-LL.B. qualification. This rule was laid down by the Pakistan Bar Council in 2016 requiring 5 years of education to obtain a Bachelor of Laws qualification. This change in the legal education rules led to the abolishing of 3 year LL.B. programs being offered by universities in Pakistan. This rule however does not affect the recognition of LL.B. degrees of less than 5 years obtained from foreign universities recognized by the Pakistan Bar Council for the purposes of enrolling as an advocate in Pakistan.

Singapore
In Singapore, the LL.B. is an undergraduate degree that is conferred by the National University of Singapore (NUS), the Singapore Management University (SMU) or the Singapore University of Social Sciences after four years of study. Three-year graduate degrees are also offered by NUS with its LL.B. (Honours) course, and SMU with a Juris Doctor (J.D.) course. In September 2020 NUS announced they are replacing their Graduate LLB with a JD programme. The JD will be a three year programme for candidates holding a non-law degree, or a two year programme for international candidates who wish to practice law in Singapore and already hold a basic law degree.  To be called to the Singapore Bar, graduates are minimally required to possess an LL.B. with a lower second-class honours from NUS or a grade point average of 3.00 from SMU.

South Africa

In South Africa the LL.B. is offered both at the undergraduate and postgraduate levels. As of 1996 it is the universal and only legal qualification for legal practice, superseding the existing B.Juris and B.Proc degrees. The undergraduate programme, offered since 1998, requires four years of study. At the postgraduate level, the programme generally requires three years. Several South African universities offer B.A. and BCom degrees with a major in "Law", and these graduates then undertake a two-year postgraduate-programme. Some universities also offer a one-year programme for holders of the BProc degree.

The curriculum is typically structured around preliminary, core and advanced courses, and most universities also offer elective coursework. The preliminary courses acquaint the students with both the background and the foundations of the South African legal system, and with legal thinking and analysis in general. The core subjects are those regularly required for legal practice. The advanced courses (usually) comprise further study in these core subjects, deepening and / or broadening the student's knowledge as appropriate. The electives – often comprising these advanced courses, amongst others – allow students to specialise in a particular area of law, to an extent, by choosing from a range of optional courses. Some universities also require that students complete an experience based course ("Practical Legal Studies" / "Law clinic"); a credit comprising independent research exclusively is often offered as an elective, and at some universities is a degree requirement.

The undergraduate LL.B. may depart from this structure. Depending on university, the curriculum will comprise legal subjects exclusively, or may include humanities subjects so as to prepare graduates with a "broad-based" legal education. Some undergraduate programmes do not offer any optional coursework. Credits in English and Afrikaans are also often included. Along with Latin, these were, but are no longer, "subjects compelled by statute", and were typically entrance requirements for the LL.B., having been studied as undergraduate modules. Similarly, Roman Law was previously a preliminary course, whereas, in both the post- and undergraduate degree, it is now offered as an elective.

Note that the structure of the undergraduate programme is under review. The issues noted are: graduates of these programmes are seen to be less prepared for the profession as compared to those pursuing the graduate LLB; only 20% of entrants complete the programme within four years; only about 50% of graduates here enter the legal profession at all. Further, there are those who question the academic standard of the new degree. Some universities have now discontinued the programme; in other cases undergraduate students are required to initially register as Arts, Commerce or Science students – with first year law subjects – and, in the second year of study, only those meeting specified criteria may choose to pursue the four-year LLB.
At the same time, it has been suggested  that some criticisms levelled at the 4 year LL.B. belie the reality of disparate standards of education offered between some of the country's elite tertiary level educational institutions, such as the Universities of Cape Town or Stellenbosch, when compared to some other universities across the country.

Lawyers

Upon completion of the LL.B. degree (or its equivalent), graduates are generally qualified to apply for membership of the bar or law society. The membership eligibility bestowed may be subject to completion of professional exams. A student may have to gain a further qualification at postgraduate level, for example a traineeship and the Legal Practice Course or Bar Vocational Course in England and Wales or the Postgraduate Certificate in Laws in Hong Kong.

In Australia some LL.B. graduates practice as a solicitor or barrister, while others work in academia, for the government or for a private company (i.e. not as a practicing solicitor or barrister). For LL.B. graduates who do choose to practice law, in some states of Australia (namely, Victoria and New South Wales), LL.B. graduates are required to undertake a 1-year articled clerkship or the Legal Practice Course (commonly Practical Legal Training or PLT) before applying for registration as a solicitor. In other states, (namely, South Australia) an LL.B. graduate is required to undertake a 6-week PLT course before applying to be admitted to the bar as a barrister and solicitor. Depending on the state where a lawyer is admitted to practice, membership in the Bar may be either restricted to barristers or open to both solicitors and barristers. In the states that maintain as split Bar system, barristers are a separate and distinct profession to that of a solicitor, and entry is attained through the successful completion of an exam and a 9-month reading period (in other words, tutelage) under a senior barrister.

In Canada, the lawyer licensing process usually requires the law graduate to (1) take further classroom law courses taught by the Law Society itself and pass a related set of written examinations, known as bar exams, and (2) undertake an articled clerkship, commonly known as articling, under the supervision of an established lawyer called a principal. The vast majority of law graduates article (i.e. work and learn) in a law firm, a government legal department, an in-house legal department of a business corporation, a community legal clinic or some other type of non-profit organization involved in legal work. However, a small minority of law graduates (with exceptional academic records) undertake instead a judicial clerkship with a specific court and under the supervision of a judge instead of working in a more "lawyer-type environment". In either articling or clerkship, there is the expectation that the law graduate will work in a variety of legal fields and be exposed to the realities of legal practice that are absent from law school's academic atmosphere.

For example, the licensing process for the Law Society of Ontario (the Province's governing law society) consists of three mandatory components: The Skills and Professional Responsibility Program with assignments and assessments, Licensing Examinations (a Barrister Licensing Examination and a Solicitor Licensing Examination), and a 10-month Articling term. At the conclusion of the licensing process, the law graduate is "called to the bar," whereby they sign their name in the Rolls of the Court of Appeal for Ontario and the Superior Court of Justice and swears lawyer-related oaths in a formal ceremony where they must appear in a complete barrister's gown and bow before judges of the local superior court and benchers of the licensing law society. After the call ceremony, they can designate themself as a "Barrister and Solicitor", and can practice law in that province.

Licensed lawyers may also exercise the powers of a Commissioner of Oaths. In the Province of British Columbia, licensed lawyers are automatically qualified to practice as a notary public subject to appointment. In Ontario and other provinces, a licensed lawyer must submit a form and pay a one-time fee to the provincial attorney general before they are appointed as a notary public.

Although not required by the licensing process, many first- and second-year law students work in law firms during the summer off-school season to earn extra money and to guarantee themselves an articling position (with the same law firms) upon their graduation from law school, because there is always fierce competition for articling positions, especially for those in large law firms offering attractive remuneration and prestige, and a law graduate cannot become a licensed lawyer in Canada if they have not gone through articled clerkship.

Alternative titles and formats

Irish B.C.L. and LL.B.
The four universities under the National University of Ireland (NUI) umbrella, award the degree of Bachelor of Civil Law (B.C.L.). These are University College Cork, University College Dublin, NUI Maynooth and NUIG. Four Irish universities and two Northern Irish universities (the University of Dublin; NUIG; Queen's University Belfast; the University of Limerick; National University of Ireland, Maynooth and the University of Ulster) award an LL.B. NUIG offer the LL.B. as a 1-year postgraduate course for holders of the B.Corp. (Bachelor of Corporate Law) or B.A. Law degrees.

University College Cork and the University of Limerick offer a two-year postgraduate LL.B. degree to outstanding non-law graduates. These courses are King's Inns approved.

Institute of Technology, Carlow, Institute of Technology, Waterford and Institute of Technology, Letterkenny also offer an LL.B. degree programme. Two English universities (University of the West of England and Nottingham Trent University) and one Welsh university (University of Wales) award the LL.B. in Ireland as a professional degree in law (the latter three are run via local private colleges). (Independent Colleges LL.B.(Hons) in Irish Law is conferred by the University of the West of England, LL.B.(Hons) in Irish Law at Dublin Business School is jointly validated by HETAC and the University of Wales and the LL.B. in Griffith College Dublin and Griffith College Cork is jointly validated by HETAC and Nottingham Trent University.)

Ireland is a common law jurisdiction (in fact there are two common law jurisdictions on the island) and the expression "civil law" is used to differentiate common law from ecclesiastical law or Canon Law in the republic.

In the nineteenth century, the University of London conferred degrees of LL.B. on clerical and lay students at St. Patrick's College, Carlow from 1840 onwards.

The King's Inns Barrister-at-Law degree B.L. is a postgraduate degree and is required to practice as a barrister in Ireland.

Zimbabwe B.L. and LL.B.
At the University of Zimbabwe, the first degree in common law is the Bachelor of Laws (B.L.), which is equivalent to the LL.B. in other common law jurisdictions. It is followed by a one-year programme at the university (analogous to post-LL.B. vocational programmes in other common law jurisdictions) at the end of which a second degree, the Bachelor of Laws (LL.B.), is awarded. The curriculum has since been changed and now only one four-year honours degree is offered abbreviated as LL.B.

Variations on the LL.B.
Some universities in the United Kingdom and New Zealand offer variations, which generally take four years to complete and include a wider range of topics as well as some degree of specialisation or the study of multiple jurisdictions, such as the LL.B. Law with French Law and Language offered by the University of East Anglia. 

Various universities in the United Kingdom and Australia will allow a degree that combines study with a non-law discipline. For example, some universities in the United Kingdom offer a combined study of law and history leading to a B.A. degree that is accepted by the Law Society and Inns of Court as equivalent to an LL.B. 

The University of London External Programme in Laws (LL.B.) has been awarding its law degree via distance learning since 1858.

At various universities in the UK such as Oxford, Nottingham and Cambridge the principal law degree is often a B.A., in either Jurisprudence or Law. The B.C.L and LL.M are second-entry and postgraduate degrees. The University of Cambridge has recently replaced their LL.B. degree with an LL.M. 

Some universities in the U.K. including Bournemouth University have a four-year LL.B. course, which consists of a 40-week industrial work placement. Staffordshire University also offer a two-year full-time LL.B. course.

A unique degree of LL.B.(Hons) Sharia and Law has been introduced by the International Islamic University, Islamabad. The distinctive feature of this course is the comparative study of both Islamic law and Common law. Similar programme can be found in Malaysia as offered by International Islamic University Malaysia and Universiti Sains Islam Malaysia.

United States
The United States no longer offers the LL.B., though some universities have introduced Bachelor of Science degrees in legal studies featuring curricula that include courses in constitutional law, tort law, and criminal law. The Master of Science of Laws (M.S.L.) is also offered in some universities accredited by the American Bar Association. While the LL.B. was conferred until 1971 at Yale University, since that time, all universities in the United States have awarded the professional doctorate J.D., which then became the generally standardized degree in most states as the compulsory prerequisite to sit for the bar exam prior to practice of law. Many law schools converted their basic law degree programmes from LL.B. to J.D. in the 1960s, and permitted prior LL.B. graduates to retroactively receive the new doctorate degrees by returning their LL.B. in exchange for a J.D. degree. Yale graduates who received LL.B. degrees prior to 1971 were similarly permitted to change their degree to a J.D., though many did not take the option, choosing to retain their LL.B. degrees.

Before the program was phased out, notable recipients of the LL.B. include former U.S. presidents Richard Nixon and Gerald Ford; former U.S. Supreme Court Justices Earl Warren, Anthony Kennedy, William Rehnquist, Ruth Bader Ginsburg, Thurgood Marshall and Stephen Breyer; former FBI director J. Edgar Hoover; American judge and jurist Richard Allen Posner; as well as the first female commissioner of the Federal Communications Commission, Frieda B. Hennock.

In 2014, the University of Arizona established the Bachelor of Arts in Law (B.A. in Law), in which undergraduate students take core law classes taught by law school faculty in subjects such as property, contracts, torts, administrative law, and criminal and civil procedure. The B.A. in Law also provides the opportunity for an expedited path to law school, allowing qualified students to start pursuing a J.D. at the University of Arizona James E. Rogers College of Law after their junior year, thus earning both a Bachelor of Arts in Law and a J.D. in six years.

Eligibility of foreign graduates in the U.S.
For the most part, foreign law graduates seeking admission to the bar in the United States will find their LL.B. law degree does not of itself fulfill the core admission requirements of most states, thereby not allowing them to take the bar exam.

The major exception to this is New York, where those foreign graduates who have fulfilled the educational requirements to practice law in another common law country through study at an approved educational institution, similar in both duration and content to the equivalent teaching at an approved U.S. law school, are permitted to sit for the bar exam. Additionally, both New York and Massachusetts permit Canadian LL.B. holders to take the bar exam. The requirements of each of the states vary, and in some states sufficient years of practice in one's home country may allow for those otherwise excluded to sit for the bar exam. 

Most states require completion of a law degree from a law school accredited by the American Bar Association. As a result, American law schools typically offer one-year LL.M. programmes for foreign attorneys; many such law schools may have no other LL.M. programmes. Classes included in these "American Law", "Comparative Law" inter alia LL.M. programmes are selected to introduce foreign attorneys to American-style common law practice, such as first-year J.D. courses on civil procedure, constitutional law, criminal law, legal research and analysis, and jurisprudence.

Situation within the European Union
European Union law permits European Union citizens with LL.B. degrees from one EU Member State, e.g., Ireland, France or Spain, who practise law and who are qualified lawyers in one of these countries for three or more years, to practise also in every other member state. The actual procedure to receive the respective national licence is regulated by the member state and therefore differs from country to country, and temporary restrictions may in certain cases exist, but every EU member has to apply the relevant EU Directives to its own national law.

As a consequence of the Bologna Process, recently many universities of applied sciences and a few traditional universities in Germany have introduced LL.B. programmes, replacing the  degree. The LL.B. is a three- or four-year full-time law degree. As opposed to courses of study leading to the State Examination—the master's-level professional law degree in Germany—most LL.B. degree programmes concentrate on private law and can feature a component of education in business administration. Graduates of LL.B. courses can continue LL.M. studies and in some cases sit for the first State Examination after one or more years of additional law studies in order to qualify for practicing law in Germany. 

In Malta, the Bachelor of Laws (LL.B.) degree, offered by the University of Malta, is an undergraduate degree that of itself is not sufficient for admission into any of the legal professions. Likewise, in Italy a five-year course in law (Laurea magistrale in giurisprudenza a ciclo unico) is offered by law schools, the model being inspired to the French and German systems . The Italian diploma in law, which is the equivalent of a Bachelor of Laws (LL.B.), does not qualify to pursue directly a career in any legal profession, as graduates are required to undergo a traineeship for the duration of 18 months to sit for the Italian bar or take the exam as public notary; alternatively, this requirement can be met by undertaking two further year of studies (Diploma di specializzazione per le professioni legali - equivalent of a 2-year M.A.). In any case, magistrate judges and prosecutors are selected by means of a competitive examination open only to lawyers, public notaries and certain other public officials pursuant to Article 2 of D. lgs. 160/06, as well as those who have completed the Diploma di specializzazione per le professioni legali pursuant to Law 111/2007 of July, 30 2007.

In Spain, there is no such thing comparable to an LL.B. degree, with law studies lasting 4 years in total. This is the result of a recent reform, which has turned the "Licenciadura en Derecho" into the "Grado en Derecho". Prior to that, the sole "Licenciatura en Derecho" was allowing graduates of law direct access to the legal profession without further training and masters. Currently, holders of a Spanish law degree must attend a specific LL.M. in Legal practice course (similar to the former British LPC) to gain admission to the Spanish bar.

In Denmark, universities now offer three-year LL.B. programmes, although this is not sufficient to practice law. Students wishing to practice law should continue with a Masters in Law programme, leading to the cand.jur degree. Alternatively, students may choose to use the LL.B. as a basis for other courses within the social sciences or humanities.

Alternative degree route in the UK
There are also conversion courses available for non-law graduates, available as an alternative to the full-length LL.B. degree course. One such example of a conversion course in England and Wales is the G.D.L. (Graduate Diploma in Law), which takes one year to complete.

In the U.K., as well as in other Common Law jurisdictions, the main approach is the Graduate Entry (undergraduate) LL.B. degree, where graduates from another discipline can complete the LL.B. as a second degree, although this may occasionally require taking qualifying law courses within the first degree to meet professional requirements in full. Therefore, it is not entirely correct to regard it as an 'accelerated' degree.

This 'double degree' system was, at one time, an alternative route to the former B.L. degree (now obsolete) but students were required to have independent means to complete the second degree. The current Scots LL.B. degree, a direct-entry undergraduate degree, meets all professional requirements when coupled with the Diploma in Legal Practice. The Diploma was introduced circa 1980; prior to this, all professional exams were taken within the degree itself (or as part of an earlier non-law degree), limiting the scope for academic study.

Therefore, the pursuit of the double degree nowadays, for school-leavers at least, is mainly to indicate that one can be adept at two disciplines. Unlike Joint Honours, a second degree is undertaken separately, within the prescribed timeframe. Rarely, the double degree principle is found in reverse; just as an arts or science degree can provide exemption from the full academic (not professional) requirements of a subsequent law degree, similarly a law degree can provide exemption from the full academic requirements of a subsequent arts or science degree. In this case, it is more likely that the second degree will be taken as a self-funding mature student, possibly on a part-time basis.

See also
 Admission to the bar
 Admission to the bar in the United States
 Call to the bar
 Doctor of Juridical Science
 Doctor of Law
 Juris Doctor
 Legal education
 Lists of law schools
 Master of Laws

Sources

References

Laws, Bachelor of
Law degrees